Richard Hale School is a boys' secondary school located in Hertford in the south east of England. In the 2014–2015 academic year, the school had over 1,000 pupils including students attending the optional sixth form, which is also open to girls.

History
The school was founded as "Richard Hale's School" on 16 April 1617 by the affluent merchant Richard Hale, who wished to "erect a grammar school for the instruction of children in the Latin tongue and other literature in the town of Hertford". The original school building was in use for 313 years from 1617 to 1930, and still stands near to All Saints' Church. For most of its life the school was known as the "Hertford Grammar School" until 1967, when it was renamed to coincide with the 350th anniversary.

It began the transition to a comprehensive school in 1975, a process completed when the last grammar intake left in 1981. New buildings were built in 1977, the gym was built in 1978 and the Sixth form centre from 2009 to 2011. It became a science college in 2003, a foundation school in 2008, and converted to academy status on 1 July 2013.

Houses
Hale gave his name to one of the five original houses of the school. The remaining four were named after the school benefactors Francis Earl Cowper KG and Richard Benyon Croft; and former pupils Lieutenant-Colonel Frank Page, DSO and bar, and the evolutionary biologist Alfred Russel Wallace. These five houses remained for several decades until a sixth house called "Kinman" was added to the growing school, named after the headteacher Major George Kinman who organised the school's move in 1930. This house was for the boys who were previously in an overflow form, and not grouped together with their other house mates. House competition is an integral part of school life at Richard Hale, with competitions taking place not only on the sports fields, but on the stage in both music and drama.

Music
Students learn instruments and play in its bands and choirs. The music department puts on concerts every year. In January 2017 the concert band and school choir performed at St. Paul's Cathedral in London as part of the school's 400th anniversary.

Science
The school is a science academy and has an interest in the scientific development of its pupils. On 26 April, the school successfully sent a balloon up to the edge of space.

Sport
The school has a long tradition of most popular sports including football, rugby, cricket, tennis, basketball and athletics. A new 3G full sized football pitch has recently been built allowing the football teams to play and train on a modern surface. This facility is also used within lessons and other extra curricular activities.

Planning permission for a new sports hall was given, however it became unaffordable so the funds were used to erect a Sixth Form Centre, which was finished in the summer of 2011. The school still wishes to build a sports hall but needs finance.

Saturday fixtures take place throughout the year with rugby, football and cricket fixtures taking place against other local schools.

Notable former pupils

 Ant Anstead, television presenter and motor specialist
 Samir Carruthers, Cambridge Utd, footballer
 Alex Davey ex-Chelsea now playing in the United States, footballer
 Mike Fibbens, swimmer
 Rupert Grint, actor
 Billy Lunn and his brother Josh Morgan, musicians of The Subways
 Rob Playford, Drum & Bass DJ, record producer and label owner
 Oliver Skipp, Tottenham Hotspur and England U21, footballer
 Harry Toffolo, Huddersfield Town, footballer
 Mark Williams, former MP for Ceredigion (Wales)

Hertford Grammar School
 Sir Roy Anderson, Rector of Imperial College London and a notable epidemiologist
 Sir Ernest Birch, colonial administrator
 Nicholas Bell, English-Australian actor
 Prof John Cannon CBE, Professor of Modern History at Newcastle University from 1976 to 1992
 Air Vice-Marshal Leslie William Cannon CB CBE, Commander-in-Chief of the Royal Pakistan Air Force from 1951 to 1955
 Rt Rev Richard Chartres, Bishop of London from 1995 to 2017
 Michael Dobbs, author and screenwriter
 Hugh F. Durrant-Whyte FRS, engineer and academic
 John Fincham, late Professor of Genetics at Cambridge University, and President of the Genetical Society from 1978 to 1981, and Editor of Heredity from 1971 to 1978
 John Flack, Bishop and Anglican representative to the Holy See, and Bishop of Huntingdon from 1997 to 2003
 David Gentleman, illustrator, and has designed the most Royal Mail stamps
 John Gladwin, Bishop of Chelmsford since 2004
 Geoff Hamilton, television presenter and gardener
 Captain W. E. Johns, author of the Biggles series
 James Judd, conductor
 Andrew Karpati Kennedy, author and literary critic
 Air Vice-Marshal Alan Merriman CB CBE AFC, Station Commander of RAF Wittering from 1970 to 1972
 Des de Moor, singer, songwriter and performer
 Kenny Pickett, singer of 1960s band The Creation
 Stephen Pound, Labour MP for Ealing North since 1997
 Derek Savage, pacifist
 Rt Rev David Smith, Bishop of Maidstone from 1987 to 1992 and Bradford from 1992 to 2002
 Alfred Wallace, naturalist, explorer, geographer, anthropologist, and biologist
 Brian Wilde, actor

References

External links 
 Richard Hale Association (formed in 1924 as the Old Hertfordians Association)
 EduBase

Educational institutions established in the 1610s
Secondary schools in Hertfordshire
Boys' schools in Hertfordshire
1617 establishments in England
Academies in Hertfordshire